David Bottoms (1949-2023) was an American poet.

Biography

Bottoms' first book, Shooting Rats at the Bibb County Dump, was selected by Robert Penn Warren as winner of the 1979 Walt Whitman Award of  the  Academy of American Poets. His poems have appeared in magazines such as The Southern Review, The Atlantic, The New Yorker, Harper's, The Paris Review, and Poetry, as well as in over four dozen anthologies and textbooks. He is the author of eight other books of poetry, In a U-Haul North of Damascus, Under the Vulture-Tree, Armored Hearts: Selected and New Poems, Vagrant Grace, Oglethorpe's Dream, Waltzing Through the Endtime, and We Almost Disappear as well as two novels, Any Cold Jordan and Easter Weekend. His most recent book of poetry, Otherworld, Underworld, Prayer Porch, was published in 2018 by Copper Canyon Press. Among his awards are the Levinson and the Frederick Bock prizes from Poetry Magazine, an Ingram Merrill Foundation Award, an Award in Literature from the American Academy and Institute of Arts and Letters, and fellowships from the National Endowment for the Arts and the John Simon Guggenheim Memorial Foundation.

Bottoms has given over 200 readings in colleges and universities across the United States, as well as the Guggenheim Museum, The Library of Congress, and The American Academy in Rome. He has been interviewed on several regional and national radio and television programs, including two interviews on National Public Radio, and he is featured in a half-hour segment of The Southern Voice, a five-part television miniseries profiling Southern writers. Essays on and reviews of his work have appeared in The New York Times, The New York Times Book Review, The Los Angeles Times, The Atlanta Journal-Constitution, Southern Living, The Southern Review,  Poetry, The Observer (London), and dozens of other newspapers and literary journals. Profiles appear in a number of resource books, including The Dictionary of Literary Biography, Contemporary Literary Criticism, and The Oxford Companion to Twentieth Century Poetry. In 2006, Bottoms was honored as a Star of the South by Irish America magazine.

Bottoms received his BA from Mercer University and his PhD from Florida State University. He has been a Richard Hugo Poet-in-Residence at the University of Montana and currently holds the John B. and Elena Diaz-Amos Distinguished Chair in English Letters at Georgia State University in Atlanta, where he co-edits Five Points: A Journal of Art and Literature and teaches creative writing. He was Poet Laureate of Georgia from 2000 to 2012.

Bibliography

Poetry

Collections
Otherworld, Underworld, Prayer Porch, (Copper Canyon Press, 2018)
We Almost Disappear, (Copper Canyon Press, 2011)
Waltzing Through the Endtime, (Copper Canyon Press, 2004)
Oglethorpe's Dream
Vagrant Grace, (Copper Canyon Press, 1999)
Armored Hearts: Selected and New Poems, (Copper Canyon Press, 1995)
Under the Vulture-Tree
In a U-Haul North of Damascus
Shooting Rats at the Bibb County Dump, (William Morrow and Company, 1980)
Jamming with the Band at the VFW
Signed for My Father, Who Stressed the Bunt,(Copper Canyon Press, 1995)

Anthology
The Morrow Anthology of Younger American Poets (editor)

List of poems

Novels
Easter Weekend
Any Cold Jordan

References

External links
 Academy of American Poets
 Georgia Secretary of State
 The New Georgia Encyclopedia
 David Bottoms Papers at Stuart. A Rose Manuscript, Archives, and Rare Book Library

Living people
1949 births
Poets from Georgia (U.S. state)
Georgia State University faculty
National Endowment for the Arts Fellows
Poets Laureate of Georgia (U.S. state)
People from Canton, Georgia
The New Yorker people